Anji is a 2004 Indian Telugu-language fantasy action-adventure film directed by Kodi Ramakrishna. The film stars Chiranjeevi in the title role along with Namrata Shirodkar, Tinnu Anand and Nagendra Babu. It is produced by Shyam Prasad Reddy on M. S. Art Movies banner. The film has music composed by Mani Sharma with cinematography by Chota K. Naidu. At an estimated budget of 2530 crore, it was the most expensive Telugu film ever made at the time of its release. 

Anji was in production for more than six years and after multiple delays, the film released on 15 January 2004 during Sankranthi festival. Though the film is noted for its special effects, it was not commercially successful due to its high budget. It was an average grosser at the box office. In addition to two Nandi Awards, the film received National Film Award for Best Special Effects, becoming the first Telugu film to win a National Award in that category. The film found a place in the Limca Book of Records as the first Indian film with 3D digital graphics.

Plot
The Aatmalingam of the Himalayas possesses enormous divine powers. Once every 72 years, the Akasa Ganga from the sky flows into Aatmalingam. Those who drink Akasagangam's holy water become immortal and gain supernatural powers.

In 1932, during the colonial rule in India a youngster named Veerendra Bhatia with two greedy tantriks is in search of the Atmalingam from a cave which is guarded by a divine trisulam and a gigantic cobra. They try to bring it but fail, resulting in the deaths of the two tantriks and Bhatia losing his right hand. The sacred Aatmalingam gets swept away in the river and becomes invisible. Time progresses and Bhatia, now 99 years old, searches for the Aatmalingam's traces, but in vain. The Akasaganga is slated to flow to the earth for the Atmalingam in 2004. Finally, he gets to know about a professor who researched the Aatmalingam and Akasaganga and possesses vital information in a red diary.

Fearing for his life and this information, the professor sends the diary to his student Swapna, who is in the US, so that Bhatia will not be able to become immortal. After receiving the journal, Swapna, sensing danger to her professor, comes back to India in search of him, only to find him killed. While escaping from Bhatia, she runs into Anji, a good Samaritan in the Uravakonda forest area, who serves the most revered Sivanna, an ayurvedic specialist, while also raising four orphans.

One day, Anji stumbles on the Aatmalingam and takes its possession. After coming to know about it, Bhatia and his men are after Anji and Swapna. As the D-Day of Akasaganga is fast approaching, Sivanna tells Anji that the Aatmalingam should be sent back to where it belongs. So, Anji goes to the Himalayas to restore Aatmalingam in a temple which is built using Saligrama by Bhagiratha. The temple becomes visible only after 72 years. Anji faces many traps in the temple and survives to restore the Aatmalingam. But Bhatia drinks the water before Anji could drink it. One of the orphans gets shot. Anji and Bhatia get into a fight, and at last, Mahakalabhairava appears and kills Bhatia using his third eye. Anji manages to run from the temple, and a drop of the holy water revives the orphan who had been shot by Bhatia. Anji, Swapna and the four orphans return to their home in a helicopter, and the Aatmalingam and the temple vanish, never to be seen again.

Cast

Chiranjeevi as Anji
Namrata Shirodkar as Swapna
Tinnu Anand as Veerendra Bhatia
Nagendra Babu as Sivanna
Bhupinder Singh as Young Bhatia
M. S. Narayana
 Akshay Reddy as Master Akshay
 Bharat as Master Bharat
 Vamsi as Master Vamsi
 Meghana Gummi as Baby Meghana
 Keerthana as Baby Keerthana
 Nitya Shetty as Baby Nithya
 Saraswatamma
Madhusudhan Rao as Bhatia's henchman (uncredited)
Ramya Krishna has a special appearance in the song "Chikbuk Pori"
Reema Sen has a special appearance in the song "Mirapakaya Bajji"
 Rajlaxmi Roy has a special appearance in the song "Manava Manava"

Production
The film was officially launched in May 1997. The shooting of the film began on 10 October 1997. In December 1998, India Today reported that Tinu Anand would play the role of a centenarian in search of a magic potion that promises eternal youth, in the film. In June 2000, Idlebrain.com reported the tentative release date of the film as 1 October 2000. On 11 September 2000, producer Shyam Prasad Reddy informed that the shooting part of Anji would be finished by 15 October 2000 and confirmed the film's release date as 22 December 2000.

On 16 September 2000, Chiranjeevi mentioned in an interview with Rediff that the film hadn't been named yet and that it would be either Anji, the name of his character or Akasaganga. He also talked about the reasons for delay: "It's because of the heavy graphics work involved. That is the only reason for the delay. For the first time in Indian cinema, we are picturising 20-24 minutes of the film in 3-D animation. It will be an amazing package of virtual reality. Quite spellbinding. The producer, M Shyamprasad Reddy, an MBA graduate from the US, is highly quality cautious, keen for this film to be the ultimate product. To that end, the graphics is being done by an expert team led by Chris, known as UK-2, at London's Digitalia Studio."In August 2000, Bhupinder Singh of Thammudu fame was reported to be part of the cast. In March 2001, it was reported that Bhupinder Singh was cast in the role of main villain whose older version was being played by Tinu Anand. By November 2001, the shooting portion of the film was completed except for the songs. The report also added that the songs would be shot in December and January and the film would be ready for release by February 2002.

In December 2001, when director Kodi Ramakrishna was asked about the film being in production for four long years, he replied:"Though it has taken 4 years to make this film, viewers would realize that it should have taken seven years to make such a powerful graphics film. It's very easy to criticize that this film is taking long time to make. I would like to appreciate Shyam Prasad Reddy for one reason. He would have made a mass film with the Chiranjeevi dates and amassed a cool profit of 3 crores. But he preferred to make an extraordinary film by putting so much of money.In May 2002, Shyam Prasad Reddy noted that the graphics work for the film was expected to be completed by 30 July and the film would be released soon after 15th of August 2002. On 23 August 2002, it was reported that only the graphics work was pending and the film might release either during Dasara festival in 2002 or during Sankranthi in 2003. On 15 December 2003, producer Shyam Prasad Reddy spoke to Idlebrain.com and noted that the film would have a theatrical release with five songs and "Gumma Gulabi Komma" song would be filmed and added in the fourth week of the theatrical run.

Concept art

Anji had digitally enhanced animated characters. The sketches of Lord Siva, Siva Lingam, and an old temple were made by the noted director and illustrator Bapu. Based on these sketches models were created and sets were made.

Music
Mani Sharma composed the songs and background score for the film. The song "Chik Buk Pori" was composed by Sri but Mani Sharma did rerecording of the song.

Release 
On 5th January 2004, Shyam Prasad Reddy announced that Anji will be censored on 7th January and that the film will release on 9th January. On 7th January, MS Arts confirmed that the release date of Anji was postponed to 14th January as the final graphics portions were getting delayed by a couple of days. 

On 8th January, conflicting release dates were published in different newspapers. Vaartha published the release date as 14th January while Andhra Jyothi published it as 15th January. The confusion was later resolved when official sources revealed the release date as 15th January and that the decision to change the release date happened late in the night of 7th January and by the time they informed the same to newspapers, Vaartha had already published all its editions.

Mohini Films, the distributors of the film in the Vizag region booked a private air cargo to ship prints from Hyderabad to Vizag which was said to be a first in the history of Telugu cinema. Anji released on 15 January 2014 during Sankranthi festival. It released on 16 January in some regions as the post-production labs could not print the required number of prints in time.

Reception 
Jeevi of Idlebrain.com rated the film 3 out of 5, commending the visual effects and Chiranjeevi's performance while criticising the screenplay and direction. A critic from Sify rated the film 3/5 and wrote, "Despite all those special effects the film is unimpressive as the subject and style is outdated." A critic from Deccan Herald wrote that "Anji teaches us how to make a movie out of a logic-defying story".

Awards
National Film Awards
 Best Special Effects – Sanath

Nandi Awards
 Best Cinematographer – Chota K. Naidu
Best Makeup Artist – Chandra Rao

References

External links

2004 films
2000s fantasy action films
2000s Telugu-language films
Indian fantasy action films
Films directed by Kodi Ramakrishna
Films scored by Mani Sharma
Films that won the Best Special Effects National Film Award